The list of ship launches in 1893 includes a chronological list of some ships launched in 1893.


References 

1893
 
1893 in transport